Live at the Village Vanguard is a live album by Marc Ribot's Trio which was released in May 2014 on the  Pi label.

Reception

The Allmusic review by Mark Deming states, "the communication between the players is total, with each in full flight as individuals and as a group, honoring the masters and finding a voice of their own at the same time". Writing for All About Jazz, Dan Bilawsaky said, "It would be overstating things to say that Ribot's engagement at the Village Vanguard, and this album documenting it, signal mass acceptance of his work. It wouldn't, however, be unfair to say that they indicate a growing audience for his magnificent and multifaceted artistry," while Mark Corroto stated, "Ribot's guitar work is unapologetically unrefined and original".  PopMatters' Will Layman stated, "The guitar sound isn’t warm and bell-like in the manner of Wes Montgomery, but rather something more like an earlier jazz player’s scratch and scrape. When the trio plays the melody slowly and loping, it sounds like real emotion. And that’s as good a summary as I can find of all of this music: really emotional. Some is raucous and some is tender, but it’s all about what’s real and feeling".

Track listing
 "Dearly Beloved" (John Coltrane) - 15:06
 "The Wizard" (Albert Ayler) - 7:59
 "Ol' Man River" (Oscar Hammerstein II, Jerome Kern) - 6:37
 "Bells" (Ayler) - 19:09
 "I'm Confessin' (That I Love You)" (Doc Daugherty, Al J. Neiburg, Ellis Reynolds) - 8:12
 "Sun Ship" (Coltrane) - 7:15

Personnel
Marc Ribot – guitar
Henry Grimes - bass
Chad Taylor - drums

References

2014 live albums
Marc Ribot live albums
Pi Recordings live albums
Albums recorded at the Village Vanguard